Verbatim (1965-1991) was an American thoroughbred racehorse and sire.

Background 
Verbatim was a dark bay or brown bred horse in Kentucky at Elmendorf Farm. He was sired by Speak John, the 1985 Champion broodmare sire in North America. His dam was Well Kept.

Racing career 
Verbatim raced from 1967 to 1970 and has several wins including the  Gotham Stakes in 1968, the Bay Shore Stakes in 1968, the Bahamas Stakes in 1968, the  Governor Stakes in 1969, and the Whitney Stakes in 1969. In total Verbatim has 51 starts, 11 firsts, 10 seconds, 7 thirds, and a total earning of $415,802.

Verbatim was trained by Jerry C. Meyer, a Canadian Horse Racing Hall of Fame thoroughbred racehorse trainer.

Stud record 
Verbatim bred at Elmendorf Farm. His most notable progeny were Princess Rooney, Alphabatim, and Summing.

Pedigree

References 

1965 racehorse births
1991 racehorse deaths
Racehorses bred in Kentucky
Racehorses trained in the United States
Thoroughbred family 10-d